The 2004 Wagner Seahawks football team represented Wagner College in the 2004 NCAA Division I-AA football season as a member of the Northeast Conference (NEC). The Seahawks were led by 24th-year head coach Walt Hameline and played their home games at Wagner College Stadium. Wagner finished the season 6–5 overall and 3–4 in NEC play to place in a three-way tie for fourth place.

Schedule

References

Wagner
Wagner Seahawks football seasons
Wagner Seahawks football